7L & Esoteric (7LES) are an American underground hip hop duo from Boston, Massachusetts, known for battle rhymes and boom bap production. 7L is the duo's DJ/producer and Esoteric is the MC. 7L & Esoteric are both prominent members of underground hip-hop collectives Army of the Pharaohs and Demigodz, as well as being 2/3 of Czarface along with Wu-Tang Clan member Inspectah Deck.

History

Early career (1993-1996) 
The duo formed in 1993 when Esoteric DJed a hip hop show at a college radio station (WMWM) north of Boston. 7L, a DJ and producer who listened to the show, contacted Esoteric in the interest of collaborating. The two found they shared a common love of the golden age of hip-hop and decided to form a group.

After performing for some time in the Boston/Cambridge underground, the duo released their first single in 1996 as God Complex with MC Karma. The B-side, "Secret Wars", gained a lot of attention as Esoteric paid tribute to the heroes of Marvel Comics in rhyme form. This led to the release of the Rebel Alliance LP, featuring acts such as Virtuoso, Mr. Lif, and Force Five. Also at this time, the two dropped the God Complex moniker and became known as simply 7L & Esoteric.

Rebel Alliance & Speaking Real Words (1997-1999) 
Soon after, 7L & Esoteric put out their first 12" (a 40 cm record) with re-mastered versions of their Rebel Alliance songs "Protocol" and "Be Alert". "Be Alert", the B-side on the record, began to receive significant radio play, due to its unique sampling of the Transformers TV theme song.  The track, which was produced by Beyonder, became very popular in the underground scene, leading the duo to several European tours, major label interest, and becoming one of the first New England hip-hop acts to appear on the Stretch & Bobbito WKCR radio show in NYC and get spins on the Wake Up Show with MTV's Sway & King Tech. URB Magazine chose 7L & Esoteric for their "Next 100" issue in 1997.

The duo then dropped the "Def Rhymes" single through Landspeed Distribution which earned them press in the Source. "Def Rhymes" was also featured on the EP Speaking Real Words, released in 1999. The album also featured Wu-Tang Clan member Inspectah Deck on the title track. During promotion for the 12", Esoteric had spent time in Philadelphia and formed the supergroup Army of the Pharaohs with Jedi Mind Tricks' frontman Vinnie Paz. Esoteric would appear three times on Jedi Mind Tricks' breakthrough album Violent By Design in 2000.

The Soul Purpose, Dangerous Connection & DC2: Bars of Death (2000-2005)
7L & Esoteric released their debut LP The Soul Purpose in the summer of 2001. The single "Call Me E.S." charted at #83 on the Billboard hip-hop singles chart. The album received the Boston Music Award for "Best Hip-Hop Album,"  and led to the duo headlining tours of the United States and Europe. Upon their return, they recorded and released their second LP in the fall of 2002 entitled Dangerous Connection featuring Jedi Mind Tricks' Stoupe, Vinnie Paz, J-Live, Apathy, and others.

After taking a break from recording, the duo released their third LP DC2: Bars of Death in the spring of 2004 with Babygrande Records. The album received overall positive reviews and was lauded by long-time fans. In 2006, Esoteric compiled an album entitled "Moment of Rarities" which was also released with Babygrande. This CD was a collection of previously unreleased tracks. Esoteric has stated that this CD was put out to fulfill contractual obligations with Babygrande Records.

A New Dope & 1212 (2006-2010) 
In 2006, A New Dope was released, taking the duo in a new direction with a more electro influenced sound and the production shared between both 7L and Esoteric. The cover featured a re-creation of an Andy Warhol and Jean-Michel Basquiat gallery poster, something that was later used by Complex Magazine for A$AP Rocky and Jeremy Scott. The mix of eclectic samples, including pieces of Suicide's electro-punk classic "Girl" ("3 Minute Classic"), Angelo Badalamenti's theme to cult TV show Twin Peaks ("Perfect Person"), and the Serge Gainsbourg/Brigitte Bardot duet "Bonnie And Clyde" ("Everywhere"), evokes the Dust Brothers' work on the Beastie Boys' Paul's Boutique according to XLR8R magazine. The album featured Ultramagnetic MCs' Kool Keith on the track "Daisy Cutta".

2010 saw the release of 1212 which marked a return to their original sound, featuring Brand Nubian's Sadat X rhyming with Esoteric on "The Handle," an ode to 1980s NBA Basketball that was recognized by ESPN.

Czarface & Every Hero Needs a Villain (2011-present) 
In 2011, it was announced that 7L & Esoteric have formed a hip hop trio with Wu-Tang Clan member Inspectah Deck called Czarface and that they were working on a self-titled debut album. The album was released on February 19, 2013. The album features guest appearances from Roc Marciano, Oh No, Ghostface Killah, Action Bronson, Cappadonna and Vinnie Paz. The album's production comes from 7L, Spada4 and DJ Premier. In 2014, 7L produced the track The King's Curse on the Army of the Pharaohs album Heavy Lies the Crown, their second album in 2014 (next to In Death Reborn). Esoteric has a verse on the track, which makes it the first appearance of the duo together since the Czarface album. Later that year, the duo appeared on a track called Hard Hats and Timbs from the EP Year of the Hyenas by Army of the Pharaohs rappers Reef the Lost Cauze and King Syze. The track features raps from Esoteric and production from 7L.

A sequel to Czarface called Every Hero Needs a Villain was released on June 16, 2015. The album's first single, "Deadly Class" featuring Meyhem Lauren, was released on April 7, 2015.

Esoteric solo venture

Discography

Studio albums
Speaking Real Words EP - Direct Records / Landspeed 1999
The Soul Purpose - Direct Records / Landspeed 2001
Dangerous Connection - Brick Records 2002DC2: Bars of Death - Babygrande Records 2004A New Dope - Babygrande Records 2006Dope Not Hype (mixtape, limited pressing) - 20061212 - Fly Casual Creative 2010

CompilationsRebel Alliance LP - Brick Records 1996DJ Revolution - R2K - 1999DJ Spinna presents - Urban Theory - Beat Suite - 2000Moment of Rarities - Babygrande Records 2005

 Collaborations 
Demigodz - The Godz Must Be Crazy EP - 2002 (Ill Boogie)
Vinyl Thug Music (7L & Beyonder) - Vinyl Thug Music - 2003
Vinyl Thug Music (7L & Beyonder) - Welcome to Shaftville U.S.A. - 2005
Army of the Pharaohs - The Torture Papers - 2006 (Babygrande Records)
Army of the Pharaohs - Ritual of Battle - 2007 (Babygrande Records)
East Coast Avengers - Prison Planet - 2008 (Esoteric, Tha Trademarc, DC The Midi Alien)
Army of the Pharaohs - The Unholy Terror - 2010 (Babygrande/Enemy Soil)
Demigodz - Killmatic - 2013 (Dirty Version)
Esoteric & Stu Bangas - Machete Mode - 2013 (Man Bites Dog)
Army of the Pharaohs - In Death Reborn - 2014 (Enemy Soil)
Army of the Pharaohs -  Heavy Lies the Crown  - 2014 (Enemy Soil)
Czarface - Czarface (with Inspectah Deck as Czarface) - 2013 (Brick Records)
Czarface - Every Hero Needs a Villain (with Inspectah Deck as Czarface) - 2015 (Brick Records)
Czarface - A Fistful of Peril (with Inspectah Deck as Czarface) - 2016 (Silver Age)
Czarface & MF DOOM - Czarface Meets Metal Face - 2018 (Get on Down)
Czarface & Ghostface Killah - Czarface Meets Ghostface - 2019 (Silver Age)
Czarface - The Odd Czar Against Us - 2019 (Silver Age)
Czarface & MF DOOM - Super What? - 2021 (Silver Age)
Czarface - Czarmageddon!'' - 2022 (Silver Age)

References

External links
 Official 7L & Esoteric website
 Official Esoteric Twitter Page
 Official 7L Twitter Page

7L and Esoteric at Discogs

American hip hop groups
East Coast hip hop groups
Musical groups from Massachusetts
Musical groups established in 1993
Underground hip hop groups
Hip hop duos
American musical duos
Czarface members